Domenico Natale Sarro, also Sarri (24 December 1679 – 25 January 1744) was an Italian composer.

Born in Trani, Apulia, he studied at the Neapolitan conservatory of S. Onofrio. He composed extensively in the early 18th century. His opera Didone abbandonata, premiered on 1 February 1724 at the Teatro San Bartolomeo in Naples, was the first setting of a major libretto by Pietro Metastasio. He is best remembered today as the composer of Achille in Sciro, the opera that was chosen to open the new Teatro di San Carlo in 1737.

Of his many intermezzi, 'Dorina e Nibbio' or L'impresario delle Isole Canarie (1724) has had an extensive performance history. With a libretto by Pietro Metastasio (his only comic libretto), it was performed often and imitated internationally (with versions by Albinoni, Gasparini, Leo, Martini and others). In recent years it was performed in the State Theatre of Stuttgart, the Bochum Symphony as well as the Semperoper Dresden.

In addition to his Operas and other large scale works, Sarro has written a considerable number of vocal cantatas which show great charm and inventiveness. 'Coronatemi il crin' for Alto, two violins and continuo, is perhaps his most well known cantata.

The only known depiction of Domenico Sarro is Nicolò Maria Rossi's painting of the Viceroy at the festa of the Quattro Altari in the Harrach collection, Sarro is one of the many composers depicted as part of the Neapolitan Court (La festa dei Quattro Altari, 1745)

Operas

References

Grove Music On-line
Robinson, Michael F. (1972) Naples and Neapolitan Opera. Clarendon Press, Oxford. .
Fingere Per Godere: Comedia Per Music (1736) by Tomaso Mariani and Domenico Sarro

1679 births
1744 deaths
Italian opera composers
Male opera composers
Italian male classical composers
Italian Baroque composers
18th-century Italian composers
18th-century Italian male musicians